Yang Sook-kyung (born 5 March 1977) was a South Korean female volleyball player.

She was part of the South Korea women's national volleyball team. 
She competed with the national team at the 2003 FIVB Women's World Cup.

References

External links
 http://www.worldofvolley.com/wov-community/players/48698/sook-kyung-yang.html
 http://www.fivb.org/EN/Volleyball/Competitions/GrandChampionCup/Women/2001/Stats/Best_Scorers.asp
 http://www.fivb.ch/vis_web/volley/wwc2003/pdf/match007.pdf
 http://www.fivb.ch/En/Volleyball/Competitions/worldcup/2003/women2/photos/PhotoGallery.asp?No=007

1977 births
Living people
South Korean women's volleyball players